The following is a timeline of the history of the city of Dakar, Senegal.

Prior to 20th century

 1857
 Gorée merchants settle in Dakar.
 French build fort on Dakar Point.
 1862 – "Master plan for Dakar is drafted by Émile Pinet-Laprade."
 1863
 Streets named.
 Catholic Apostolic Vicariate of Senegambia established.
 1867 - Port was opened for commerce.
 1872 – Town becomes part of the commune of Gorée.
 1878 – Population: 1,600.
 1885
 Rue Blanchot mosque built (approximate date).
 Opening of the Dakar–Saint-Louis railway (163 miles long).
 1887
 Dakar commune formed.
 Jean Alexandre becomes mayor.
 1891 – Population: 8,737.
 1900 – "Military seaport" built.

20th century

1900s–1950s
 1902 – Capital of French West Africa moved to Dakar from Saint-Louis.
 1903 –  created.
 1904
 Avenue Gambetta, Avenue de la Liberté, and Boulevard de la République open.
 Population: 18,447.
 1905 – Brest-Dakar telegraph in operation.
 1907
  built. 
 L'A.O.F. newspaper begins publication.
 1908 – Harbor constructed.
 1913
 Democratie du Senegal newspaper begins publication.
 National Archives of Senegal formed.
 1914
 Train station opens.
 Bubonic plague epidemic.
 1918
 French West Africa School of Medicine established.
 Population: 25,468.
 1920 – Blaise Diagne becomes mayor.
 1921 – Population: 32,440.
 1924 – Dakar–Niger Railway begins operating.
 1926 – Population: 33,679.
 1929
 Gorée annexed to Dakar.
  formed.
 1933
 Paris-Dakar newspaper begins publication.
 Foyer France Sénégal football club formed.
 1934 – Armand-Pierre Angrand becomes mayor.
 1936 – Catholic Cathédrale du Souvenir africain de Dakar inaugurated.
 1938 - Institut Français d’Afrique Noire and museum founded.
 1940 - Battle of Dakar.
 1940s –  photo studio in business.
 1944 – Thiaroye Massacre.
 1950 – Cours Sainte Marie de Hann founded.
 1957 – University of Dakar established.
 1959
 City becomes capital of Mali Federation.
 French Cultural Centre created.

1960s–1990s
 1960 –  movement active.
 1961
  newspaper begins publication.
 Population: 374,700 urban agglomeration.
 1962 – House of Slaves (Gorée) museum opens.
 1963
 December: Political demonstration; crackdown.
 Borom Sarret film released (set in Dakar).
 1964 - Dakar Grand Mosque built.
 1966
 Daniel Sorano Theatre opens (approximate date).
 Amity Stadium opens (approximate date).
 World Festival of Black Arts held.
 1969 – Population: 581,000 urban agglomeration.
 1970
 Le Soleil newspaper begins publication.
 Club Baobab opens.
 1972 – Enda Third World and Centre Culturel Régional Blaise Senghor established.
 1973 – Council for the Development of Social Science Research in Africa headquartered in Dakar.
 1974 – Laboratoire Agit'Art (art group) formed.
 1975 – Association Nationale des Bibliothécaires, Archivistes et Documentalistes Senegalais headquartered in city.
 1978 – Dakar Rally motor vehicle race begins.
 1984
 Mamadou Diop becomes mayor.
 WalFadjri newspaper begins publication.
 1989
 May: Meeting of the Organisation internationale de la Francophonie held in city.
  opens.
 Ethnic violence.
 1990
 Dakar Biennale begins.
 Public library established.
  art movement develops.
 Population: 1,405,000 (urban agglomeration).
 1993
 Sud Quotidien begins publication.
 West African Research Center established.
 1994
 Henriette-Bathily Women's Museum opens.
 Kermel market burns down.
 1995 – Population: 1,688,000 (urban agglomeration).
 1996
 Municipal administration divided into 19 communes d'arrondissement: Biscuiterie, Cambérène, Dieuppeul-Derklé, Fann-Point E-Amitié, Gueule Tapée-Fass-Colobane, Gorée, Grand Yoff, Grand Dakar, Hann Bel-Air, HLM, Médina, Mermoz-Sacré-Cœur, Ngor, Ouakam, Parcelles Assainies, Patte d'Oie, Dakar-Plateau, Sicap-Liberté, and Yoff.(fr)
 City becomes part of Dakar Department, Dakar Region.
 Musée des Forces Armées Senegalaise established.
 1997
 Media Centre de Dakar in operation.
 Mosquée de la Divinité built.
 1998 – Doole community exchange system established.
 1999 –  begins.
 2000 – Population: 2,029,000 (urban agglomeration).

21st century

 2001 – Student protests.
 2002 – Pape Diop becomes mayor.
 2003
 Le Quotidien newspaper begins publication.
 West Africa Democracy Radio begins broadcasting.
 Meeting of the Association Internationale des Maires Francophones held in city.
 Closure of the Dakar–Saint-Louis railway, (approx date)
 2005 – Population: 2,434,000 (urban agglomeration), 1,030,594 (city).
 2006 – City hosts African Swimming Championships.
 2007 – June: Economic protest.
 2008 - Raw Material Company (art space) founded.
 2009
 City website online (approximate date).
 Khalifa Sall becomes mayor.
 2010 – African Renaissance Monument dedicated.
 2011
 City hosts World Social Forum and ICANN conference.
 Google office in business.
 Population: 3,035,000.
 2013
 June: U.S. President Obama visits city.
 Air pollution in Dakar reaches annual mean of 34 PM2.5 and 141 PM10, much higher than recommended.
 2014
 November: Meeting of the Organisation internationale de la Francophonie held in city.
  installed.

See also
 Dakar history (fr)
 List of mayors of Dakar
 
 
 Timeline of Saint-Louis, Senegal

References

This article incorporates information from the French Wikipedia.

Bibliography

in English
published in 20th century
 
 
 
 M. Diouf. (1999). "Urban youth and Senegalese politics: Dakar 1988-1994", In J. Holston, ed., Cities and Citizenship. Durham, NC: Duke University Press

published in 21st century
 
 
 
 
 
 
  
 
 
 
  (Includes timeline)

in French
  (+ table of contents)

External links

  (Bibliography of open access  articles)
  (Images, etc.)
  (Images, etc.)
  (Images, etc.)
  (Bibliography)
  (Bibliography)
  (Bibliography)
 
 

 Timeline
Dakar
Senegal history-related lists
Years in Senegal
Dakar